Camille Ziade (20 March 1943 – 2 October 2022) was a Lebanese politician. He served in the Parliament of Lebanon from 1992 to 2000, representing the Keserwan District. Self-described as a moderate, he opposed the economic policy of Prime Minister Rafic Hariri.

Biography
Ziade was a member of the Democratic Renewal Movement. After his defeat in 2000, he joined the Qornet Shehwan Gathering the following year. A few months later, he became a member of the executive committee of the Democratic Renewal Movement. In 2005, he ran for Parliament on the March 14 Alliance list, but failed to gain a seat. After the death of Nassib Lahoud, he became president of the Democratic Renewal Movement, a position he held for three years.

Ziade died in Herharaya on 2 October 2022, at the age of 79.

References

1943 births
2022 deaths
Lebanese politicians
Democratic Renewal (Lebanon) politicians
Members of the Parliament of Lebanon
People from Keserwan District